Petr Bolek (born 13 June 1984) is a Czech footballer who plays for TJ Tatran Třemošná as a goalkeeper.

Club career
He was signed by Spartak Trnava in January 2019.

Honours 
Spartak Trnava
 Slovak Cup: 2018–19

References

External links

1984 births
Living people
Sportspeople from Ostrava
Czech footballers
Association football goalkeepers
Czech First League players
Czech National Football League players
Slovak Super Liga players
FC Slovan Liberec players
FC Hlučín players
1. FC Slovácko players
FC ViOn Zlaté Moravce players
FK Senica players
Kasımpaşa S.K. footballers
FC Dolní Benešov players
FC Viktoria Plzeň players
FK Baník Sokolov players
MFK Karviná players
FC Spartak Trnava players
ŠKF Sereď players
Czech Republic youth international footballers
Czech expatriate sportspeople in Slovakia
Czech expatriate sportspeople in Turkey
Expatriate footballers in Slovakia
Expatriate footballers in Turkey